Alison Turnbull (born 16 March 1956, Bogotá) is a Colombian-born British painter and sculptor.

Early in her career, Turnbull worked as an invigilator at the Serpentine Gallery.

Exhibitions

Solo exhibitions 
 2001 "Houses into Flats," Museum of Modern Art, Oxford
 2003 "Hospital," Matt's Gallery, London
 2010 Matt's Gallery, London
 2012 Talbot Rice Gallery, Edinburgh
 2013 De La Warr Pavilion, East Sussex
 2014 Shandy Hall, North Yorkshire
 2015 Royal Botanic Garden Edinburgh
 2016 Art Seen, Nicosia

Group exhibitions 
 2010 Parallel Remix, Leonard Hutton Galleries, New York
 2010 On the Edge of the World, Royal Botanic Garden, Edinburgh
 2011 The Russian Club Gallery, London
 2012 The Bluecoat, Liverpool
 2012 The Fruitmarket Gallery, Edinburgh
 2013 "Galápagos," Centro de Arte Moderna (CAM), Lisbon
 2013 "Universal Fragments: Conversations with Trevor Shearer," Large Glass, London (2013)
 2014 "Summer Exhibition," Royal Academy of Art, London
 2014 "Colour on Paper," Galeria Leme, São Paulo
 2015 "Multiplicities," Art Seen, Nicosia
 2016 "Seeing Round Corners: the Art of the Circle," Turner Contemporary, Margate
 2016 "Blackrock," Lydney Park Estate, Gloucestershire
 2016 "Compression," Ormston House Gallery, Limerick

Further reading 
 Hoare, Philip. "The Eden project" The Guardian. 15 April 2005.
 Lack, Sarah. "Turnbull, Alison." In Grove Art Online. Oxford Art Online, (accessed March 22, 2012; subscription required).

External links
 Entry for Alison Turnbull on the Union List of Artist Names
 Overview with link to collections Alison Turnbull from the British Council
 Exhibition of work by Alison Turnbull at Matt's Gallery
 Alison Turnbull's website
 Alison Turnbull at Art Seen
 Alison Turnbull at Cove Park

British women sculptors
British women painters
1956 births
People from Bogotá
Living people
Scottish contemporary artists
20th-century British women artists
21st-century British women artists